State Route 65 (SR 65), formerly State Route 66 (SR 66), is a primary state highway in the U.S. state of Virginia.  The state highway runs  from U.S. Route 23 (US 23), US 58, and US 421 in Clinchport north to US 58 Alternate in Castlewood.

Route description

SR 65 begins at an intersection with US 23, US 58, and US 421 (Orby Cantrell Highway) just west of the town limit of Clinchport.  The state highway heads northeast through the town as 2nd Avenue, which passes under CSX's Kingsport Subdivision.  SR 65 becomes Clinch River Highway east of town and parallels the Clinch River and Norfolk Southern Railway's Clinch Valley Division northeast to Fort Blackmore, where the highway begins to run concurrently with SR 72 (Veterans Memorial Highway) to the town of Dungannon.  Within the town, SR 72 continues north parallel to the railroad and the Clinch River as Hanging Rock Parkway while SR 65 crosses the river and heads east as Sinking Creek Highway, which follows Sinking Creek across the Scott–Russell county line.  The state highway, now named Mew Road, passes through the hamlet of Mew while passing through a broad valley on its way to its northern terminus at US 58 Alternate (Castlewood Road) at Banners Corner in the unincorporated area of Castlewood.

History
SR 65 was designated in March 1958 as a result of the renumbering of the former SR 66 between Clinchport and Castlewood. SR 66 was renumbered due to the impending construction of Interstate 66 in the northern part of the state; the Commonwealth Transportation Board recommended that all routes that shared a number with a proposed Interstate be renumbered. No major routing changes have occurred to the route since its designation.

Major intersections

References

External links

Virginia Highways Project: VA 65

065
State Route 065
State Route 065